Digvijaysinh Pratapsinhji Jhala  (20 August 1932 – 4 April 2021) was an Indian politician from Gujarat. He served as India's first environment minister in the central government.

Early life
Jhala was born at Ranjit Vilas Palace at Wankaner on 20 August 1932, the eldest son of Captain Maharana Raj Shri Pratapsinhji Sahib of the princely state of Wankaner, by his wife, Sisodiji Maharani Sri Rama Kanwar Sahiba.

He was educated at Rajkumar College, Rajkot and graduated from Cambridge University, and obtained a doctorate from Delhi University's St Stephen's College.

Family
In 1955, Jhala married Maharajkumari Baiji Lal Pratap Kumari Sahiba, eldest daughter of Sir Tej Singhji, Maharaja of Alwar State. Jhala married again in 1982, to Vibha Singh, daughter of a senior bureaucrat and diplomat Shri Bhagwan Singh. She was media personality and also served as a consul general of Nauru. Jhala and Vibha's only son, Kesarisihji, was born in 1983. Kesarisihji is a member of the Bharatiya Janta Party.

Wankaner State
Jhala was heir apparent to the throne of the princely state of Wankaner at birth, holding the title Yuvraj Sahib of Wankaner officially from 1932, when the State merged with newly-independent India. He succeeded his father in 2007 as the titular King of Wankaner and head of its royal house.

Political career
Jhala entered politics after the independence of India and joined the Indian National Congress. He was a Member of Legislative Assembly for Wankaner in the Gujarat Legislative Assembly for the years 1962-67 and 1967-71. He was then elected Member of Parliament for Surendranagar for two terms, from 1980 to 1989. He also served as the Union Deputy Minister for Ecology and the Environment from 1982 to 1984.

Personal life
Being very active in public life, Jhala was also Convener of the Indian Heritage Hotels Association, Gujarat, Chairman of Gujarat Hotels Association and President of the Wankaner Co-op Agricultural Bank Ltd for 1962-1964.

He was Director of Shree Amarsinhji Mills Ltd since 1960, a cotton textile mill founded in 1951 by his grandfather Sir Amarsinhji Banesinhji, which was later taken over by Kores India in 1980.

He served as a director of India Tourism Development Corporation for the years 1968-1982.

He was a founder member of the Indigenous Horse Society of India founded in 1999. He was also a member of the Gujarat State Water Pollution Control Board since 1976, National Committee for Environmental Planning since 1981 and president of the Akhil Bharatiya Kshatriya Mahasabha since 1989.

Jhala died on 4 April 2021 at the age of 88, after a brief illness.

See also
MK Ranjitsinh Jhala

References

External links
 Official biographical sketch in Parliament of India website

1932 births
2021 deaths
Lok Sabha members from Gujarat
Gujarat MLAs 1962–1967
Gujarat MLAs 1967–1971
Indian National Congress politicians from Gujarat
20th-century Indian royalty
Gujarati people
People from Rajkot district
India MPs 1980–1984
India MPs 1984–1989
Delhi University alumni
Alumni of the University of Cambridge
Indian environmentalists
Indian businesspeople in textiles